Alangiaceae was recognized as a small family of small dicotyledon trees, shrubs or lianas, closely related to the Cornaceae (dogwood family).

There is only one genus, Alangium, with seventeen species.

The APG II states that Alangiaceae is a synonym of Cornaceae (the Dogwood family), but still recognizes it as a nom. cons. ( = name to be retained)

References
 Concordance of the Taxa in Cornidae sensu Reveal

External links
 Alangiaceae in BoDD – Botanical Dermatology Database

Cornales
Flora of Pakistan
Monogeneric plant families
Historically recognized angiosperm families